Atomosphyrus is a genus of South American jumping spiders that was first described by Eugène Louis Simon in 1902.  it contains three species, found in Chile, Argentina and Brazil: A. breyeri, A. tristiculus and A. wandae.

References

Salticidae
Salticidae genera
Spiders of South America